Pan Yue may refer to:

 Pan Yue (poet) (247–300), Western Jin dynasty poet
 Pan Yue (politician) (born 1960), Chinese politician